Codorus Township is a township in York County, Pennsylvania, United States. The population was 3,898 at the 2020 census.

History
The S. B. Brodbeck Housing was added to the National Register of Historic Places in 1990.

Geography
The township nearly encircles the borough of Jefferson, along the township's northern border.

Demographics
At the 2000 census there were 3,646 people, 1,344 households, and 1,099 families living in the township.  The population density was 108.9 people per square mile (42.0/km).  There were 1,398 housing units at an average density of 41.8/sq mi (16.1/km).  The racial makeup of the township was 98.30% White, 0.08% African American, 0.44% Native American, 0.25% Asian, 0.25% from other races, and 0.69% from two or more races. Hispanic or Latino of any race were 0.22%.

Of the 1,344 households 31.7% had children under the age of 18 living with them, 71.4% were married couples living together, 5.7% had a female householder with no husband present, and 18.2% were non-families. 15.6% of households were one person and 6.9% were one person aged 65 or older.  The average household size was 2.71 and the average family size was 2.99.

The age distribution was 23.6% under the age of 18, 6.8% from 18 to 24, 27.3% from 25 to 44, 29.9% from 45 to 64, and 12.3% 65 or older.  The median age was 41 years. For every 100 females, there were 101.0 males.  For every 100 females age 18 and over, there were 99.6 males.

The median household income was $48,514 and the median family income  was $53,468. Males had a median income of $36,465 versus $24,022 for females. The per capita income for the township was $19,955.  About 2.3% of families and 4.4% of the population were below the poverty line, including 6.2% of those under age 18 and 4.7% of those age 65 or over.

References

Populated places established in 1734
Townships in York County, Pennsylvania
Townships in Pennsylvania